David Kirby is a journalist based in Brooklyn, New York, and was formerly a regular contributor to The New York Times since 1998. He is the author of Evidence of Harm (2005), Animal Factory (2010), Death at Sea World (2012), and When They Come for You (2019). Kirby has written on thiomersal and vaccines and has criticized factory farms.

Biography
Kirby has written for many national magazines, including Glamour, Redbook, Self and Mademoiselle. From 1986 to 1990, Kirby was a foreign correspondent for UPI, and Newsday (among others) in Latin America, covering wars in El Salvador and Nicaragua, and he covered politics, corruption and natural disasters in Mexico. It was during this time that he was also a reporter for OutWeek.

From 1990 to 1993, Kirby was director of public information at the American Foundation for AIDS Research (AmFAR), worked for New York City Council President Carol Bellamy, and was a senior staff adviser to David Dinkins' successful 1989 run for mayor of New York City.

In 1998, Kirby wrote a cover story for The Advocate, "Does coming out matter?". From 1998 to 2001, he wrote many articles for The Advocate, including one on the courage of young gay and lesbian scouts and service members.

From 2000 to 2004, Kirby contributed several articles on travel to The New York Times, including "Rainbow Beach Towels on Mexican Sand", an article on the gay tourism industry in Puerto Vallarta. He has also written on topics other than travel and leisure, including on a new phenomenon, known as "dirty driving", the playing pornography on DVD screens inside vehicles while they drive through traffic. The article expressed concern for what children have been exposed to by these "dirty drivers".

In 2005, Kirby's book Evidence of Harm - Mercury in Vaccines and the Autism Epidemic: A Medical Controversy was published.

Since May 2005, Kirby has been a contributing blogger at The Huffington Post.

Research

Evidence of Harm

Evidence of Harm (2005) explores the controversies surrounding thimerosal containing vaccines (TCVs), and whether TCVs have contributed to the apparent increase of autism, ADHD, speech delay and other childhood disorders in the United States. In the book, Kirby tells the personal stories of parents of children who have autism, founders of the advocacy group SafeMinds, including Sallie Bernard, Lyn Redwood, Mark Blaxill, Albert Enayati, Heidi Roger and Liz Birt.

The autism-vaccine link has been firmly discredited, including any suggested evidence of a link between thimerosal and autism. The majority of scientific consensus agrees with vast population studies that have shown there to be no link between vaccines, autism, and thimerosal. The original paper by Andrew Wakefield that started a media firestorm and led to fears of vaccination amongst parents has been discredited and research by journalist Brian Deer showed the data used in the paper to be fraudulent.

British Medical Journal review
In May 2005, Evidence of Harm was reviewed negatively in the British Medical Journal. The reviewer described Kirby's book as "woefully one-sided", and wrote: "In his determination to provide an account that is sympathetic to the parents, Kirby enters into the grip of the same delusion and ends up in the same angry and paranoid universe into which campaigners have descended, alleging phone taps and other forms of surveillance as they struggle against sinister conspiracies between health authorities and drug companies.

Animal Factory

In 2010, Kirby authored Animal Factory: The Looming Threat of Industrial Pig, Dairy, and Poultry Farms to Humans and the Environment. The book exposes the business interests, environmental effects and terrible conditions of factory farms.

It was positively reviewed by the National Public Radio who concluded that "the growth of factory farming in America obviously brings up issues of animal welfare, labor and nutrition, but Kirby's focus in Animal Factory is purely how the farms are changing, perhaps irrevocably, the environments and the long-term health of the people who live near them. There's no political pleading or ideological agitprop in this book; it's remarkably fair-minded, both sober and sobering."

Selected publications

 Evidence of Harm: Mercury in Vaccines and the Autism Epidemic: A Medical Controversy (2005)
 Animal Factory: The Looming Threat of Industrial Pig, Dairy, and Poultry Farms to Humans and the Environment (2010)
 Death at SeaWorld: Shamu and the Dark Side of Killer Whales in Captivity (2012)
 When They Come for You: How Police and Government Are Trampling Our Liberties - And How to Take Them Back (2019)

References

External links
David Kirby - Author website for When They Come for You and other books
HuffingtonPost.com - David Kirby's blog at The Huffington Post
Kirby on The Looming Threat of Industrial Farms on Humans and the Environment - video report by Democracy Now!
The Problem with Factory Farms - Interview with David Kirby

American animal welfare scholars
American investigative journalists
American medical journalists
HuffPost writers and columnists
Living people
MMR vaccine and autism
Newsday people
The New York Times writers
Thiomersal and vaccines
Year of birth missing (living people)